Omega Ophiuchi, which is Latinized from ω Ophiuchi, is a single, variable star in the equatorial constellation of Ophiuchus, located just to the north of the ecliptic near the western constellation border with Scorpius. It is a white-hued star that is faintly visible to the naked eye with an apparent visual magnitude that fluctuates around 4.45. Parallax measurements indicate it lies at a distance of about 168.6 light years from the Sun. It is drifting further away with a radial velocity of +2.5 km/s.

This object is an Ap star with a stellar classification of ApSrEuCr, displaying strong abundance anomalies of the elements strontium, europium, and chromium. It is an Alpha2 Canum Venaticorum variable, with its brightness ranging from magnitude 4.44 down to 4.51 over a period of 2.99 days. A strong magnetic field has been measured on the surface.

Omega Ophiuchi is around 860 million years old with a projected rotational velocity of 32.2 km/s and a rotation period of 2.3 days. It has 2.3 times the mass of the Sun and 3.0 times the Sun's radius. The star is radiating 35 times the luminosity of the Sun from its photosphere at an effective temperature of 8,150 K. It is a source of X-ray emission.

References

A-type main-sequence stars
Ap stars
Alpha2 Canum Venaticorum variables

Ophiuchus (constellation)
Ophiuchi, Omega
BD-21 4381
Ophiuchi, 09
148898
080975
6153